The Musketeers is a BBC television historical action drama that is based on the characters of Alexandre Dumas's novel The Three Musketeers. The series stars Tom Burke as Athos, Santiago Cabrera as Aramis, Howard Charles as Porthos and  Luke Pasqualino as d'Artagnan. The Musketeers was commissioned on 3 May 2012, premiered on 19 January 2014 and concluded on 1 August 2016.

Series overview 
These are the premiere and finale dates for the show airing on BBC One, its origin channel. Series 2 concluded earlier in the US, and Series 3 was aired/released before the UK in multiple countries; see the episode tables and broadcast details for these dates.

Episodes

Series 1 (2014)

Series 2 (2015)

Series 3 (2016) 
The third series premiered in Canada on Showcase Canada on 10 April 2016 The full series was made available on Netflix Latin America on 16 April 2016, and on Hulu in the United States on 14 May 2016. The series premiered in the UK on 28 May 2016.

References

External links 
BBC episode guide

Musketeers
Musketeers